Episkyros, or Episcyrus, ({{Literal translation|'upon the skyros'''}}; also ,) was an Ancient Greek ball game. The game was typically played between two teams of 12 to 14 players each, being highly teamwork-oriented. The game allowed full contact and usage of the hands. While it was typically men who played, women also occasionally participated. 

Although it was a ball game, it was quite violent (at least in Sparta). The game is comparable to Rugby, American Football, or Calcio Fiorentino, at least in concept. The two teams would attempt to throw the ball over the heads of the other team. The teams would change possession of the ball often, until one of the teams was forced behind their line. In Sparta, a form of Episkyros was played during an annual city festival that included five teams of 14 players. The Greek game of Episkyros, or a similar game called 
was later adopted by the Romans, who renamed and transformed it into Harpastum.
"Harpastum" is the latinisation of the Ancient Greek , meaning "snatched away"
from the verb , meaning "I seize" or "I filch."

A depiction on a vase displayed at the National Archaeological Museum, Athens shows a Greek athlete balancing a ball on his thigh. This image is reproduced on the European Cup football trophy.
Other ancient Greek sports with a ball besides Episkyros were:  (dribbling),  ("sky ball")
and maybe 
from
 ( "ball", "sphere")
and
 ("battle"),
though it has been argued that the Sphairomakhia in this context is rather a boxing competition, and the sphairai were a form of boxing gloves. 
Julius Pollux includes  and harpastum in a list of ball games:Phaininda takes its name from Phaenides, who first invented it, or from phenakizein (to deceive), because they show the ball to one man and then throw to another, contrary to expectation. It is likely that this is the same as the game with the small ball, which takes its name from harpazein (to snatch) and perhaps one would call the game with the soft ball by the same name.

See alsoHarpastumTrigon''
History of football
American football
History of physical training and fitness

Notes

References
 

Ancient Greek sports
Ball games
Team sports